is a railway station in the town of Asakawa, Fukushima, Japan operated by East Japan Railway Company (JR East).

Lines

Station layout
The station has two opposed side platforms connected by a footbridge. However, only one of the platforms is currently in operation. The station is staffed.

Platforms

History
Iwaki-Asakawa Station opened on December 4, 1934. The station was absorbed into the JR East network upon the privatization of the Japanese National Railways (JNR) on April 1, 1987.

Passenger statistics
In fiscal 2018, the station was used by an average of 174 passengers daily (boarding passengers only).

Surrounding area
Asakawa Town Hall
Asakawa Post Office

See also
 List of Railway Stations in Japan

References

External links

  

Stations of East Japan Railway Company
Railway stations in Fukushima Prefecture
Suigun Line
Railway stations in Japan opened in 1934
Asakawa, Fukushima